Paper dolls are figures cut out of paper or thin card, with separate clothes, also made of paper, that are usually held onto the dolls by paper folding tabs. They may be a figure of a person, animal or inanimate object. Paper dolls have been inexpensive children's toys for almost two hundred years. Today, many artists are turning paper dolls into an art form.

Paper dolls have been used for advertising, appeared in magazines and newspapers, and covered a variety of subjects and time periods. Over the years, they have been used to reinforce cultural beliefs regarding the appearance of ideal women.

Today, they have become highly sought-after collectibles, especially as vintage paper dolls become rarer due to the limited lifespan of paper objects. Paper dolls are still being created today.

Some flat plastic figures are similar to paper dolls, like Colorforms figures and Flatsy dolls, but these are mere imitations and not considered true archetypal characteristics of the paper doll art form. Magnetized versions of paper dolls have also been produced over the years.

Paper dolls have regained popularity with young children featuring popular characters and celebrities. Online and virtual paper dolls like KiSS, Stardoll and Doll makers also have a popular following, with users able to drag and drop images of clothes onto images of dolls or actual people.

History

Paper dolls have been around as long as there has been paper, perhaps hundreds or even thousands of years by some estimates. Faces or other objects were applied to the paper and they were used during religious rituals and ceremonies in the Asian cultures many centuries ago. The Japanese used paper for origami, the art of paper folding, and dating back to 800 AD they folded paper figurines in the shape of kimono. Balinese people made paper and leather into puppets since before the Common Era. Other cultures around the world have had paper formations or paper art, including in Poland, where they were called Wycinanki. These early types of paper figures differ from typical paper dolls today, as no clothes were made to be used with the dolls.

The first manufactured paper doll was “Little Fanny”, produced by S&J Fuller, London, in 1810.
In Europe, particularly France, the first paper dolls were popular since the mid-18th century. The oldest known paper doll card is hosted by Germanisches Nationalmuseum and was printed around 1650 in Southern Germany, showing two female figures with a number of dresses, pieces of headgear, hairstyles and accessories. The paper was jointed and they were called pantins meaning dancing or jumping jack puppet. They were intended to entertain adults and spread throughout high society. They were drawn or painted like people with fashions for each doll. These were more similar to contemporary Western paper dolls. Rare hand-painted sets of paper figures dating to the late 1780s can be found in some museums today.

"The History and Adventures of Little Henry", by J. Belcher, was the first American toy that included paper dolls. Published in 1812, this book prompted children to act out various scenes with the paper dolls that were included.

The biggest American producer of paper dolls, McLoughlin Brothers, was founded in early 1800 and was sold to Milton Bradley in 1920s. Around this time paper dolls became popular in the USA and then grew in popularity in the following decades. The rise of paper doll production in the mid-19th century to mid-20th century was partially due to technological advances that made printing significantly cheaper.

Book publishing companies that followed in the production of paper dolls or cut-outs were Lowe, Whitman, Saalfield and Merrill among others. Movie stars and celebrities became the focus in the early days of paper dolls in the USA. Paper dolls are still produced today and Whitman and Golden Co. still publish paper dolls.

Besides movie stars, women of leisure tended to be the women featured in paper doll form. As more women began to enter the work force in the twentieth-century, paper doll manufacturers began to produce dolls that represented career women. The women's rights movement in mid-20th century was partially responsible for instigating this change. Brides were another common figure often represented in paper doll form.

Collecting
Vintage paper dolls with hand-painted artwork are becoming increasingly rare due to paper aging issues. They have become collectible, and the prices for mint uncut sets can range from $100 to over $500 for a sought after title.

Convention
A paper doll convention is held every year in the United States. In 2016, one was held in Phoenix, Arizona.

See also 
 Jumping jack (toy)
 Margaret G. Hays (1874-1925) - most famous American female paper doll manufacturer
 Grace Drayton (1877-1936) - second most famous female American paper doll maker, sister of Margaret and apprentice to Tom Tierney
 Tom Tierney (1928-2014) - The reputed "king" of paper doll artists, responsible for training and supporting many respected paper doll manufacturers
 Fashion doll
 Dress-Up
 Kewpie

References

External links 

 The Original Paper Doll Artists Guild
Guide to the Paper Dolls Collection mid 19th century at the University of Chicago Special Collections Research Center

Doll, paper
Traditional dolls
Doll, paper
Traditional toys